The Book Bucket Challenge is an online challenge where people share the names of ten books that inspired them on their social networking pages, or donate books to the needy and share photos of this with friends on social networking sites. The challenge originated in India. It is named after the Ice Bucket Challenge, and went viral on social media during August and September 2014.

Significance

As an alternative to the Ice Bucket Challenge, the Book Bucket Challenge served the dual purpose of highlighting water scarcity and spreading the usefulness and joy of reading. The book bucket challenge focuses on raising awareness of the importance of literacy and the value in reading books.

Rules

Anyone can participate in this challenge by simply listing the names of 10 books that inspired them on their social networking page and challenging  others to do the same. The program also involves donating books to a nearby library or to the needy and uploading photos of all these on social networking pages and challenging others to do the same.

History

The Book Bucket Challenge started off by One Library Per Village (OLPV), an NGO based in Kerala working towards promoting Digital Literacy in villages. The Book Bucket Challenge by now has already spread to other nations, like Canada,  Vietnam and Bangladesh.

References

External links
 

2010s fads and trends
Projects established in 2014
Challenges
Health-related fundraisers
Internet memes introduced in 2014
Viral videos
Amyotrophic lateral sclerosis
Literacy in India
2014 establishments in India
Charity events
Internet memes introduced from India